Ussuritidae are ancestral, Triassic, Phylloceratina characterized by generally smooth, discoidal, evolute shells with rounded venters and little or no ornamentation and by sutures with primitive monophyllitic saddles with a single terminal branch or leaflet.

The Ussuritidae are most likely derived from the Dieneroceratidae and give rise to the Discophyllitidae. Seven genera are included:  
Ussurites
Palaeophyllites
Monophyllites 
Majsvarites 
Leiophyllites 
Eopsiloceras 
Eophyllites  
Genera are distinguished on the basis of shell morphology and characteristics of the suture.

Ussuritidae are also known as the Monophyllitidae, a junior synonym. Palaeophyllitidae, for Palaeophyllites, is sometimes found in the literature.

References

Ammonitida families
Triassic first appearances
Triassic extinctions